Karlee Macer (born April 18, 1971) is a Democratic member of the Indiana House of Representatives, representing the 92nd district. Macer also works at a retirement community.

References

External links
Official Legislative website
 
Twitter account

Living people
1971 births
Democratic Party members of the Indiana House of Representatives
Women state legislators in Indiana
21st-century American politicians
21st-century American women politicians